Events in the year 1825 in Bolivia. This year is celebrated in Bolivia as the official beginning of the nation, with the Declaration of Independence issued on 6 August.

Incumbents 
 Head of State:
 Simón Bolívar (12 August–29 December)
 Antonio José de Sucre (starting 29 December)

Ongoing events 
 Bolivian War of Independence (1809–1825)
 Invasion of Chiquitos (1825)

Events

March 
  Invasion of Chiquitos: The Empire of Brazil attempts to annex Chiquitos, now part of the Santa Cruz Department

April 
 1 April – War of Independence – Battle of Tumusla: Carlos Medinaceli Lizarazu defeats Pedro Antonio Olañeta in the last confrontation of the Bolivian War of Independence.

May 
 30 May – Invasion of Chiquitos: Brazil evacuates Chiquitos.

August 
 6 August – War of Independence: The Bolivian Declaration of Independence, in which Bolivia officially declares independence from the Spanish Empire, is approved by the General Assembly of Deputies of the Province of Upper Peru.
 12 August – Simón Bolívar enters Bolivian territory. From that day, by virtue of the decree that proclaimed independence, he became the 1st President of Bolivia.
 17 August
 A green-red-green tricolor is adopted by the General Assembly as the flag of Bolivia.
 A design is adopted by the General Assembly as the coat of arms of Bolivia.

December 
 29 December – Bolívar renounces his position and delegates command to Antonio José de Sucre.

Births

Deaths 
 2 April – Pedro Antonio Olañeta, Spanish Royalist general (b. 1774)

Notes

Footnotes

Citations

Bibliography 

 
1800s in Bolivia
Bolivia
Bolivia
Years of the 19th century in Bolivia